Thomas Dos Santos (born 13 March 1992) is a French-Portuguese professional footballer who plays as a midfielder for French lower-league club Aviron Bayonnais.

Career
Dos Santos was born in Bayonne, France. He began his football career with local side Aviron Bayonnais. He moved to Nantes U-19 in 2009, and went on to play for a number of amateur clubs in the CFA, CFA 2 and Aquitaine Honneur, with a short spell with Spanish Tercera División club Puertollano. On 6 August 2015, Dos Santos signed his first professional contract in Greece with Football League club Ergotelis. He left the club during the 2015 Christmas break due to unpaid wages, and returned to France, and the CFA 2 after joining Genêts Anglet in 2016.

References

External links
 
 Player profile at foot-national.com (French)
 

1992 births
Living people
French-Basque people
French people of Portuguese descent
Sportspeople from Bayonne
French footballers
Footballers from Nouvelle-Aquitaine
Association football midfielders
Championnat National 2 players
Championnat National 3 players
Football League (Greece) players
Aviron Bayonnais FC players
USC Corte players
Ergotelis F.C. players
Genêts Anglet players
French expatriate footballers
French expatriate sportspeople in Spain
Expatriate footballers in Spain
French expatriate sportspeople in Greece
Expatriate footballers in Greece